is a former Japanese football player.

Playing career
Takemoto was born in Kanagawa Prefecture on October 3, 1973. After graduating from high school, he joined Japan Football League club NKK in 1993. Although he played many matches, the club was disbanded end of 1993 season. In 1994, he moved to JFL club Fujieda Blux (later Fukuoka Blux, Avispa Fukuoka). In 1995, he played as regular player and scored 14 goals. The club also won the champions and was promoted to J1 League from 1996. However he could hardly play in the match in 1996 and he moved to JFL club Tokyo Gasin August 1996. In 1997, although he returned to Avispa, he could not play many matches and moved to JFL club Fukushima FC. Although he played many matches, the club was disbanded end of 1997 season due to financial strain. In 1998, he moved to JFL club Mito HollyHock. In 1999, he moved to newly was promoted to J2 League club, Sagan Tosu. In 1999, he played as regular player and scored 16 goals and became a top scorer in the club. However he could not play at all in the match for injuries in 2000. From 2001, he played many matches and retired end of 2002 season.

Club statistics

References

External links

1973 births
Living people
Association football people from Kanagawa Prefecture
Japanese footballers
J1 League players
J2 League players
Japan Football League (1992–1998) players
NKK SC players
Avispa Fukuoka players
FC Tokyo players
Fukushima FC players
Mito HollyHock players
Sagan Tosu players
Association football forwards